Lake Wales High School is a high school located in Lake Wales, Florida, serving the city of Lake Wales and nearby communities such as Frostproof, Dundee, and Winter Haven, Florida
.

History
Lake Wales served white students only until 1968, when Federally mandated integration required the school to take in 260 black students from Roosevelt High School, which was then repurposed as a junior high school.

Alumni 
 Pat Borders - Major League Baseball catcher 1988–2005, MVP of 1992 World Series for Toronto Blue Jays, Olympic gold medalist
 Dominique Jones - pro basketball player
 Rolan Milligan - football safety who is currently on the Indianapolis Colts
 Wade Davis - Major League Baseball pitcher
 Amare Stoudemire - NBA power forward and center (2002-2017), former NBA Rookie of the Year (2003), now playing in the Israeli Basketball Premier League

See also 
 Polk County Public Schools

References

External links 
Lake Wales High School Official Web Site
Lake Wales Charter School System
City of Lake Wales

High schools in Polk County, Florida
Buildings and structures in Lake Wales, Florida
Public high schools in Florida
Charter schools in Florida
1921 establishments in Florida
Educational institutions established in 1921